Alyona Shamotina (born 27 December 1995) is a Ukrainian hammer thrower. She competed in the women's hammer throw at the 2017 World Championships in Athletics.

References

External links

1995 births
Living people
Ukrainian female hammer throwers
World Athletics Championships athletes for Ukraine
Place of birth missing (living people)
21st-century Ukrainian women